Thomas William Mitchinson (24 February 1943 – 2006) was an English professional footballer who played as a midfielder for Sunderland.

References

1943 births
2006 deaths
Footballers from Sunderland
English footballers
Association football midfielders
Sunderland A.F.C. players
Mansfield Town F.C. players
Aston Villa F.C. players
Torquay United F.C. players
AFC Bournemouth players
English Football League players